Kandy Four Gravets and Gangawata Korale Divisional Secretariat is a  Divisional Secretariat  of Kandy District, of Central Province, Sri Lanka.

References

Divisional Secretariats of Kandy District
 
Geography of Kandy District